The 12th Canadian Infantry Brigade was a brigade-sized infantry formation of the Canadian Army which saw service as part of the 4th Canadian Division in both World War I and later in World War II, this time as part of the 5th Canadian Division.

References

Infantry brigades of the Canadian Army
Canadian World War I brigades
Canadian World War II brigades
Military units and formations established in 1914
Military units and formations disestablished in the 1940s